Dominic Grazioli (born February 4, 1964, in Fort Dix, New Jersey) is an American trap shooter. He won a total of ten medals (4 gold, 2 silver, and 4 bronze) for men's trap shooting at the ISSF World Cup. He also captured a silver medal at the 1997 Championship of the Americas in Buenos Aires, Argentina, and achieved a fourth-place finish at the 1999 ISSF World Shooting Championships in Tampere, Finland. Additionally, Grazioli serves as a reserve major in the U.S. Air Force at Randolph Air Force Base in San Antonio, Texas.

Grazioli qualified for the men's trap shooting at the 2008 Summer Olympics in Beijing, by placing second from the U.S. Olympic Team Trials for Shotgun in Kerrville, Texas. He finished only in twenty-third place by four points behind his teammate Bret Erickson from the fourth attempt, for a total score of 113 targets.

References

External links
 
 
 
 

American male sport shooters
Trap and double trap shooters
Living people
Olympic shooters of the United States
Shooters at the 2008 Summer Olympics
People from Myrtle Beach, South Carolina
Sportspeople from South Carolina
Sportspeople from San Antonio
1964 births
United States Air Force World Class Athlete Program
20th-century American people
21st-century American people